Ummeedh is a 2008 Maldivian horror suspense thriller short film written and directed by Ali Shifau. Produced by Mohamed Ali under Dark Rain Entertainment, the film stars Mohamed Manik, Ahmed Asim, Ibrahim Jihad and Hamdhoon Farooq in pivotal roles.

Premise
A group of four friends, Farhad (Mohamed Manik), Mohamed (Ahmed Asim), Afrah (Ibrahim Jihad) and Ibrahim (Hamdhoon Farooq) start their journey for a day fishing trip. Four hours later, when the group decided to sail back home, the engine stops abruptly and they get stranded at sea. A while later, they come across a cargo boat titled "Ummeedh" and together they get onto the boat once they confirmed it as a local ship. Afterwards, they start wandering on the ship hoping to meet somebody who can help them to return home. Confirming the absence of any human on the boat, they start eating the foods in the kitchen which later turns out to be expired and rotten. Having experienced strange events from their arrival, the friends separate to search for people. During this hunt, they find Ibrahim dead on the deck of the boat which creates distress and perturbation among the friends.

The hold of documents including a log penned by the boat captain indicated that nine years ago "Ummeedh" boat was reported missing along with its crews after sailing from Ivory Coast, where it loses all the connection from the port and authorities. Soon after, the crews, one by one, were killed under strange circumstances, in the presence of an unknown woman.

Cast 
 Mohamed Manik as Farhad
 Ahmed Asim as Mohamed
 Ibrahim Jihad as Afrah
 Hamdhoon Farooq as Ibrahim
 Sheela Najeeb as ghost
 Abdulla Firash as boy on Safari boat

Response
The film was released on 23 June 2008 to positive reviews from critics where the direction, cinematography and performance of the actors were highlighted, and it was considered a positive change to the local cinema of melodrama. The film was later made available for streaming on Baiskoafu application on 30 October 2019.

Accolades

References

Maldivian short films
2008 short films
2008 films
Films directed by Ali Shifau